Cross Inn railway station was situated on the line between  and , about half a mile (0.8 km) to the east of Llantrisant village. Typically for this line, the station had a single passenger platform a few goods sidings.

Today
The platform and buildings still exist – although now in private use - alongside the mothballed Pontyclun to Cwm Colliery line over which trains ran regularly until 1984.

References

External links

Disused railway stations in Rhondda Cynon Taf
Former Taff Vale Railway stations
Railway stations in Great Britain opened in 1875
Railway stations in Great Britain closed in 1952